Schöner Brunnen (en:beautiful fountain) is a 14th-century fountain located on Nuremberg's main market next to the town hall and is considered one of the main attractions of the city's Historical Mile. The fountain is approximately 19 meters high and has the shape of a Gothic spire.

History 
The fountain was built by Heinrich Beheim from 1385 to 1396.

Description 

The 40 colorful figures that adorn the fountain represent the world view of the Holy Roman Empire. They are philosophy, the seven liberal arts, the four Evangelists, the four Church Fathers, the seven Prince-electors, the Nine Worthies, Moses and seven Prophets (Hosea, Daniel, Jeremiah, Ezekiel, Amos, Isaiah and Joel).

The two brass rings embedded in the fence surrounding the fountain on opposite sides are said to bring good luck to those who spin them.

References 

Buildings and structures in Nuremberg